At the start of this season two home victories against Kenfig Hill 39-17 and Kidwelly 31-16, contrasted against big away defeats at Mumbles 26-60, Tumble 3-29, Aberystwyth 5-55 and Blaengarw 6-45. This left Ystalyfera at the lower end of the league table at the end of November, and only great efforts from the players starting with a hard fought win away at Waunarlwydd 14-11, turned things around. Four consecutive victories before the new year plus seven wins in March and April saw Ystalyfera eventually finish 6th out of 16. Cup success was restricted to the Swansea Valley Cup where the ‘Fera lost another final this time at home to Vardre 10-17. Captain this season was Craig Lloyd, top points scorer Damian James with 144 points and top try scorer Phillip Thomas with 15. Phillip won Players Player and Ashley Carter got the Supporters vote.

National League Division 4 West

Ystalyfera 2001/02 Season Results

Ystalyfera 2001/02 Season Player Stats

References

Sport in Neath Port Talbot